Walnut Township is one of twenty-four townships in Bates County, Missouri, and is part of the Kansas City metropolitan area within the USA.  As of the 2000 census, its population was 419.

Geography
According to the United States Census Bureau, Walnut Township covers an area of 45.88 square miles (118.84 square kilometers); of this, 45.65 square miles (118.24 square kilometers, 99.5 percent) is land and 0.23 square miles (0.6 square kilometers, 0.5 percent) is water.

Cities, towns, villages
 Foster

Unincorporated towns
 Worland at 
(This list is based on USGS data and may include former settlements.)

Adjacent townships
 Homer Township (north)
 Charlotte Township (northeast)
 New Home Township (east)
 Howard Township (south)
 Sheridan Township, Linn County, Kansas (southwest)
 Potosi Township, Linn County, Kansas (west)
 Valley Township, Linn County, Kansas (northwest)

Cemeteries
The township contains these two cemeteries: Salem and Woofin.

Airports and landing strips
 Oerke Enterprises Airport

School districts
 Hume R-VIII
 Miami R-I
 Rich Hill R-IV

Political districts
 Missouri's 4th congressional district
 State House District 125
 State Senate District 31

References
 United States Census Bureau 2008 TIGER/Line Shapefiles
 United States Board on Geographic Names (GNIS)
 United States National Atlas

External links
 US-Counties.com
 City-Data.com

Townships in Bates County, Missouri
Townships in Missouri